Sik Kong Tsuen is a village Ha Tsuen, Yuen Long District, Hong Kong.

Administration
Sik Kong Tsuen is a recognized village under the New Territories Small House Policy.

History
At the time of the 1911 census, the population of Sik Kong Tsuen was 381. The number of males was 178.

See also
 San Wai (Ha Tsuen)
 Sik Kong Wai

References

External links

 Delineation of area of existing village Sik Kong Tsuen (Ha Tsuen) for election of resident representative (2019 to 2022)
 Antiquities and Monuments Office. Hong Kong Traditional Chinese Architectural Information System. Sik Kong Wai

Villages in Yuen Long District, Hong Kong
Ha Tsuen